Aperiodic means non-periodic.
Typically it refers to aperiodic function.
Aperiodic may also refer to:
 Aperiodic finite state automaton
 Aperiodic frequency
 Aperiodic graph
 Aperiodic semigroup
 Aperiodic set of prototiles
 Aperiodic tiling

See also
 Periodic (disambiguation)
 Strange attractor, a region reached asymptotically by a dynamic system showing no periodic repeating pattern